Michael Kutza (born 1942) is a filmmaker, a graphic designer and the founder of the Chicago International Film Festival. In addition, he has been involved in other film festivals internationally, in such diverse locations as Taormina, Tehran, Moscow, Manila, Bogota, Los Angeles, Cannes, Berlin and Jerusalem, and has served as an advisor to a number of other festivals, including the Berlin International Film Festival and the Locarno International Film Festival. In 1977 he was a member of the jury at the 10th Moscow International Film Festival. From 1979 to 1991, he served Italian journal II Tempo as its American film correspondent. He has received numerous honors for cultural achievements.

Chicago International Film Festival
In 1964, at the age of 22, Michael Kutza founded the Chicago International Film Festival, subsequently serving as its artistic director until 2016. Starting in 2017, he now acts as the president and CEO of Cinema/Chicago, the Festival's parent organization.

Through its early years, Kutza personally screened and selected the films that would be shown at the Festival. It was during this period, in 1967, that Kutza viewed and selected for its world-premiere I Call First, the first film of director Martin Scorsese, which would later be expanded and rereleased as Who's That Knocking at My Door. Kutza has been an outspoken proponent of foreign-language films.

Honors
Kutza has received a number of honors for his cultural achievements. Among them, in 1972, Kutza received the Silver Lion Award at the Venice Film Festival, and in 1978, the Chicago Sun-Times' "Exceptional Contribution to Chicago" award. In 1985, Jack Lang, then the French Minister of Culture, bestowed the Chevalier de L'ordre des Arts et des Lettres upon him during the Cannes Film Festival for his work in promoting fine arts.

In 1987, Kutza served on the Camera d'Or Jury at the Cannes Film Festival. In 1995, he was a member of the jury at the 45th Berlin International Film Festival. In 1996, the city of Chicago honorarily designated S. Michigan Ave from Van Buren to Congress as "Michael J. Kutza Way." In 2009, Kutza was honored by the Landmarks Preservation Council of Illinois as one of its "Legendary Landmarks", a title bestowed on "citizens who have made contributions to the civic and cultural life of Chicago and Illinois." In 2010, Kutza accepted the "Media Award" from the Niagara Foundation's Peace & Dialogue Awards. The same year, Chicago Magazine included Kutza on their list of "Top 40 Chicago Pioneers," alongside Oprah, Barack Obama, Studs Terkel, Roger Ebert, and Gene Siskel. In 2012, Kutza received the American Cinematheque's Sydney Pollack Award. Cinematheque chairman Rick Nicita described the award: “The Sydney Pollack Award honors someone who has been of critical importance and continuing influence in non-profit film exhibition, film preservation and/or independent film distribution - people whose work Sydney supported and found to be so valuable, who are not often recognized for their efforts. And there’s no one who better represents Sydney’s commitment to the art of film than Michael.”   In June 2015, Michael Kutza was named a Knight of the Legion of Honour by the President of the French Republic for his achievements as "an internationally
recognized graphic designer, filmmaker and the Founder of the Chicago International Film Festival." The Italian government awarded Kutza with the Order of Merit of the Italian Republic in 2017 for his contribution to Italian film.

References

http://www.chicagofilmfestival.com/wp-content/uploads/2015/06/51FestPR-Legion-of-Honour-award.pdf

External links 
 http://www.chicagofilmfestival.com/

1942 births
Living people
American filmmakers
American graphic designers